Cleopatra Selene may refer to:

Cleopatra Selene of Syria, daughter of Ptolemy VIII Physcon and Cleopatra III of Egypt
Cleopatra Selene II, also known as Cleopatra VIII, daughter of Cleopatra VII and Mark Antony. Client Queen of Mauretania.